This is a list of fellows of the Royal Society elected in 1724.

Fellows
 John Byrom (1692–1763), philosopher and poet, inventor of a shorthand 
 Stephen Chase, gentleman 
 Nicolaus Cruquius (1678–1754), Dutch surveyor 
 Joseph Danvers (1686–1753), MP 
 Joannes Jacobus Dillenius (1684–1747), physician and botanist 
 John Diodate (1690–1727) 
 John Dobyns (died 1731), surgeon 
 John Eames (1686–1744), dissenting tutor 
 Anthony Ellys (1690–1751), Bishop of St Davids
 Daniel Gabriel Fahrenheit (1686–1736), Dutch-German-Polish physicist, engineer and glass blower
 Joannes Adolphus Jacobaeus (1698–1772), Danish Professor of Medicine 
 John Kendall (died 1735), barrister 
 Ralph Leicester (c.1699–1777) 
 Charles Lennox, 2nd Duke of Richmond, Lennox and Aubigny (1701–1750) 
 Smart Lethieullier (1701–1760), antiquary 
 Joseph-Nicolas de Lisle (1688–1768), French astronomer and cartographer 
 John Meres (died 1726), apothecary. Clerk to Society of Apothecaries
 Robert Ord (1700–1778), MP. Chief Baron of the Scottish Exchequer
 Littleton Powys (1647?– 1732), barrister. Justice of the King's Bench
 John Ranby (1703–1773), surgeon 
 John Gaspar Scheuchzer (1702–1729), Swiss naturalist, physician and writer 
 Francis Scott, 2nd Duke of Buccleuch (1695–1751) 
 Edward Vernon (c. 1695–1761), clergyman and antiquarian

References

1724
1724 in science
1724 in England